The Schnalser Bach is a stream located in South Tyrol, Italy. It flows into the Adige near Naturns.

References 
Civic Network of South Tyrol (in German)

Rivers of Italy
Rivers of South Tyrol